The Power Tower is the first high-rise office tower to attempt to meet the strict Passive House energy efficiency building standard.  It was built to house the corporate headquarters of the Austrian utility company Energie AG in Linz, Austria.

In accordance with the Passive House standard the building has no connection to the local district heating system, and requires no fossil fuel inputs to maintain a comfortable interior climate, resulting in much lower carbon dioxide emissions than comparable buildings.

History 
In 2004 Energie AG decided to replace its corporate headquarters, built in the 1930s, with a much more efficient building.  After an architectural competition the Zürich firm Weber/Hofer was chosen to lead the design effort.  In the spring of 2006 construction began on the 3,750 m^2 lot.  The site houses a parking garage, a two story building, and the 19-story office tower.  Construction was completed in the late summer of 2008, and the building now provides offices for 600 employees of 13 different companies.

Building Energy Systems 
The Power Tower minimizes its external energy consumption via several integrated systems.

Advanced Building Envelope 
The building envelope was specially engineered to allow maximum daylighting while minimizing solar gain, which would normally be excessive and require a great deal of active cooling, given that two thirds of the facade is composed of glazing.

Geothermal Heating and Cooling 
Beneath the building, 46 geothermal wells, each 150 m deep were drilled prior to construction.

References

External links 
 Energie AG Oberösterreich

Low-energy building
Sustainable buildings and structures
Sustainable architecture
Environmental design
Buildings and structures in Linz
Skyscraper office buildings in Austria
Skyscrapers in Austria
Office buildings completed in 2008